Vibeke Westbye Skofterud (20 April 1980 – 29 July 2018) was a Norwegian cross-country skier. She won gold in the 4 × 5 km relay at Vancouver in 2010. Her best individual finish at the Winter Olympics was eighth in the 30 km event at Salt Lake City in 2002.

Skofterud won a complete set of 4 × 5 km relay medals at the FIS Nordic World Ski Championships (gold: 2005, gold: 2011, silver: 2003, bronze: 2007) and earned her best individual finish of 13th in the 5 km + 5 km double pursuit in 2003.

Her first individual victory came in a pursuit race in Norway in 2006.

In 2012, Skofterud became the first Norwegian to win the Vasaloppet official ladies class. She set a new record time, 4.08,24, more than 8 minutes faster than the previous record from 1998. This was the first time ever she competed in a race as long as 90 km.

The 2012/2013 World Cup season proved to be difficult for Skofterud, due to illness and injuries, and she was forced to quit the season halfway through. She made a comeback on the national team the following winter, but her results were less than satisfactory. After failing to qualify for the 2014 Winter Olympics, Skofterud announced her retirement from the national team, in favour of a career in ski marathon.

She retired from cross-country skiing in 2015.

Cross-country skiing results
All results are sourced from the International Ski Federation (FIS).

Olympic Games
 1 medal – (1 gold)

World Championships
 4 medals – (2 gold, 1 silver, 1 bronze)

a.  Cancelled due to extremely cold weather.

World Cup

Season standings

Individual podiums

 15 podiums – (12 , 3 )

Team podiums
17 victories  – (17 )
23 podiums –  (23 )

Personal life
In 2005, Skofterud turned down an offer to appear in the Norwegian edition of the men's magazine FHM. The rejection came after pressure from the Norwegian Ski Federation.

Skofterud suffered from eating disorders, which she claimed as a reason for canceling many competitions in the previous seasons.

Skofterud confirmed in June 2008 that she was in a committed relationship with a woman. She had previously been in relationships with men.

Skofterud was reported missing in the early morning of 29 July 2018 and was found dead on an islet. The police stated that she most likely died instantly from injuries after a jetski accident near Arendal. Skofterud was under the influence of alcohol at the time of the incident, with a blood alcohol level above the legal limit of 0.8‰. 
She was 38 years old.

References

External links

Official website 

1980 births
2018 deaths
Cross-country skiers at the 2002 Winter Olympics
Cross-country skiers at the 2010 Winter Olympics
Lesbian sportswomen
Norwegian LGBT sportspeople
Norwegian female cross-country skiers
Olympic cross-country skiers of Norway
Olympic gold medalists for Norway
Olympic medalists in cross-country skiing
People from Østfold
FIS Nordic World Ski Championships medalists in cross-country skiing
Medalists at the 2010 Winter Olympics
Boating accident deaths
Alcohol-related deaths in Norway
LGBT skiers
Sportspeople from Viken (county)